Wurm is the third full-length studio album by Filipino rock band Wolfgang. It is an English-language concept album about a man who criticized and then replaced his emperor. However, he in turn was criticized when he ascended to the throne. The album achieved Platinum status in the Philippines. The record was also released in Japan in 1998 through Sony Music Japan.

Track listing

Personnel
 Sebastian "Basti" Artadi (vocals)
 Manuel Legarda (guitar)
 Ramon "Mon" Legaspi (bass)
 Leslie "Wolf" Gemora (drums)

Additional musicians:
 Radhi & Jeanne – guest vocals (track 7)
 Radhi – guest vocals (track 13

Album credits
 Produced by: Dennis Cham & Wolfgang
 Engineered by: Dennis Cham
 Mixed by: Dennis Cham & Wolfgang
 Mastered by: Dennis Cham
 Executive producer: Mony Romana
 Recorded & mixed at: HIT Productions
 Art direction & design by: Miguel Mari & Sebastian Artadi
 Photography by: Miguel Mari, Sebastian Artadi, Don Sepe, and Cristina Cadtillo

References

External links
 Wolfgang discography (archived)

1997 albums
Wolfgang (band) albums